Gniewczyna Tryniecka is a village in the administrative district of Gmina Tryńcza, within Przeworsk County, Subcarpathian Voivodeship, in south-eastern Poland.

History

In 1942 Polish citizens of Gniewczyna Łęczycka and Gniewczyna Tryniecka detained and for several days tortured the remaining Jewish population of the village, before handing them over to the Germans for execution.

References

Gniewczyna Tryniecka
Holocaust locations in Poland
Jewish Polish history